Many Santa Clara University alumni have competed in the Olympic Games. All SCU rugby players who competed at the 1920 and 1924 Games were on the gold medal-winning United States rugby teams.

Antwerp 1920
Rudolph Scholz, Rugby
James Fitzpatrick, Rugby
John Muldoon, Rugby
William Muldoon, Rugby
John O'Neil, Rugby

Paris 1924
Rudolph Scholz, Rugby
H. Cunningham, Rugby
John Muldoon, Rugby
William Muldoon, Rugby
John O'Neil, Rugby
Caesar Mannelli, Rugby

Mexico City 1968
Cathy Jamison, Women's Swimming

Los Angeles 1984
Kelly Mitchell, Women's Rowing
Rick Davis, Men's Soccer

Seoul 1988
Rick Davis, Men's Soccer

Barcelona 1992
Cameron Rast, Men's Soccer

Atlanta 1996
Brandi Chastain, Women's Soccer

Sydney 2000
Brandi Chastain, Women's Soccer
Nikki Serlenga, Women's Soccer
Danielle Slaton, Women's Soccer
Steve Nash, Men's Basketball

Athens 2004
Aly Wagner, Women's Soccer
Mary McConneloug, Cycling

Beijing 2008
Aly Wagner, Women's Soccer
Mary McConneloug, Cycling
Janet Culp, Synchronized Swimming

Sochi 2014
Polina Edmunds, Figure Skating

Rio de Janeiro 2016
Julie Johnston, Women's Soccer

Tokyo 2020
Julie Ertz, Women's Soccer

References

Santa Clara University